The Rose Bowl, known for sponsorship reasons as Ageas Bowl is a cricket ground and hotel complex in West End, Hampshire. It is the home of Hampshire County Cricket Club, who have played there since 2001.

It was constructed as a replacement for the County Ground in Southampton and also the United Services Recreation Ground in Portsmouth, which had been Hampshire's homes since 1882. Hampshire played their inaugural first-class match at the ground against Worcestershire on 9–11 May 2001, with Hampshire winning by 124 runs. The ground has since hosted international cricket, including One Day Internationals, matches in the 2004 Champions Trophy, two Twenty20 Internationals and Test matches in 2011, 2014 and 2018, when England played Sri Lanka and India. In 2020, the ground was used as one of two biosecure venues, alongside Old Trafford, for the tours involving West Indies, Pakistan and Ireland which were regulated due to the COVID-19 pandemic.

In order to be able to host Test cricket, the ground underwent a redevelopment starting in 2008, which saw stands built to increase capacity and other construction work undertaken to make the hosting of international cricket at the ground more viable. A four-star Hilton Hotel with an integrated media centre overlooking the ground opened in 2015. Following Hampshire Cricket Ltd finding itself in financial trouble in 2011, the lease on the ground was sold to Eastleigh Borough Council for £6.5 million with a benefactor injecting a similar sum in 2012.

The Rose Bowl played host to the inaugural final of the 2019–21 ICC World Test Championship between India and New Zealand, resulting in New Zealand being crowned inaugural World Test Champions.

During ICC tournaments, the ground is referred to as the Hampshire Bowl due to sponsors names not being allowed.

History

Background

Hampshire had played at their Northlands Road headquarters in Southampton since 1885, as well as using Dean Park in Bournemouth, the United Services Recreation Ground in Portsmouth and May's Bounty in Basingstoke as regular outground venues. Northlands Road was a cramped location, surrounded by residential buildings which meant expanding the ground was largely impossible. Hampshire also wanted to encourage international cricket to the county, which would not have been possible with Northlands Road. Talk of a move from Newlands Road had begun as early as 1987, with Mark Nicholas discussing the idea with then Hampshire vice-chairman Bill Hughes in a Leeds restaurant. A site was eventually selected just outside Southampton, in West End, on a gently sloping field owned by Queen's College, Oxford located between the M27 motorway and Telegraph Woods.

The ground was designed by architect Sir Michael Hopkins, whose design of the centrepiece pavilion with its tented roof was reminiscent of the Mound Stand at Lord's, which Hopkins also designed. Construction started on the ground in 1997, however, the budget for the ground's construction soon spiralled out of control, threatening the very existence of the club.  Further funding was secured as construction continued until its first stage was completed in time for the 2001 season. Its final cost was £20 million, with a large part of that cost being secured with Lottery and Sport England funding, while the club's financial future was secured by the incoming chairman, Rod Bransgrove.

The ground is built into the side of the gently sloping hill on which it is located, resulting in an amphitheatre bowl. The initial name for the ground was announced in 2000 as The Rose Bowl, in recognition of the club's rose and crown logo and the bowl-shaped nature of the ground.

Early years

Hampshire's first scheduled county match at the ground was a List A match in the 2001 Benson & Hedges Cup against Essex on 2 May, though the match was abandoned without a ball bowled due to rain, therefore the first completed match on the ground was a List A match in the same competition against Surrey on 4 May, which Hampshire lost. First-class cricket was first played there days later on 9–11 May, when Hampshire played Worcestershire in the County Championship, which resulted in Hampshire's first victory there with a 124 run victory. Hampshire were not the only tenant in the first year of the ground, with the Hampshire Cricket Board playing Ireland in September 2001 in the Cheltenham & Gloucester Trophy.

In November 2001, the England and Wales Cricket Board (ECB) awarded the Rose Bowl a Youth Test match between England Under-19s and India Under-19s. The following month the ECB announced the Rose Bowl would be awarded One Day International status with effect from 2004. The pavilion was completed in March 2002 at a cost of £2 million, and upon completion it was the only pavilion among the first-class counties to have jacuzzis in the players changing rooms.

In 2003, the ground played host to only the second ever Twenty20 match played, when Hampshire hosted Sussex in the Twenty20 Cup. The Rose Bowl hosted its first One Day International (ODI) on 10 July 2003, when South Africa played Zimbabwe in the 2003 NatWest Series, with numerous publications calling the hosting of the match a resounding success for Hampshire.

In 2004, the ground hosted another ODI between New Zealand and the West Indies in the 2004 NatWest Series, though the match was abandoned without a ball bowled. The ground later held five ODIs during that seasons Champions Trophy, which saw India post 290/4 against Kenya, the United States dismissed for 65 by Australia, and Mervyn Dillon take figures of 5/29 for the West Indies against Bangladesh: all three of these records remain to this day in terms of the highest and lowest innings scores in ODI cricket at the ground, as well as the best innings bowling figures.  During the course of the tournament, England also played there for the first time, against Sri Lanka, though The Rose Bowl was criticised for its organisation of the match, with spectators citing access to the ground, long queues and stringent searches at the gate among complaints.

In 2005, England played their first ever Twenty20 International (T20I) against Australia as part of the Ashes series, with England winning the match by 100 runs.

In 2006, England played another T20I against Sri Lanka, which England won, due in large to Marcus Trescothick's 72. The Rose Bowl hosted three further ODIs prior to the grounds redevelopment, hosting Pakistan in 2006, India in 2007 and Australia in 2009. The ground held Twenty20 Cup Finals Day in 2008, which saw Middlesex defeat Kent in front of a capacity crowd. Prior to the redevelopment, major matches such as this match and international matches were catered for by erecting temporary seating to boost the grounds capacity from 6,500 to 15,000.

The early years at the ground were notable for immature wickets that favoured seam bowling, resulting in many low scoring encounters. The quality of these pitches drew much criticism. In the first season, seamer Alan Mullally took 8/90 against Warwickshire in the County Championship, which remains the best innings bowling figures at the ground. As the pitches settled down, higher scores became more frequent, though it was still more favourable to bowlers than batsmen.  In 2005, Hampshire scored 714/5 against Nottinghamshire, in a match which also saw John Crawley record the first triple century at the ground. His unbeaten 311 helped Hampshire to reach that formidable total.  These records remain to this day as the highest team and individual scores at The Ageas Bowl. Worcestershire posted the lowest first-class total at the ground in 2007, making 86.

Expansion
The attraction of international cricket to Hampshire was one of the main motivators facilitating Hampshire's move from Northlands Road. While Hampshire had attracted ODI cricket, Test cricket still proved elusive in attracting. Hampshire had applied to the ECB for the Ageas Bowl to be given Test status, applying as early as 2006 for the right to host Test matches, however their application was rejected, with Glamorgan's SWALEC Stadium instead preferred to host a Test match during the 2009 Ashes series. This rejection persuaded Hampshire chairman Bransgrove to invest £35 million in redeveloping the ground, which would include the construction of a new access road to alleviate the transport problems which have affected major matches, the expansion of the ground's capacity and the construction of a hotel to make the Ageas Bowl more financially viable for Hampshire. By the time permission had been granted for the first phase of the redevelopment to commence, costs had risen to £45 million.

The plans called for the construction of two matching stands either side of the pavilion to increase the permanent capacity to 15,000, as well as a four-star, 175-room hotel overlooking the ground at the northern end. Access problems for spectators were to be eased by creating two ticket gates to access to ground, as well as creating an additional access road off Moorhill Road.

The redevelopment plans led to the ECB awarding the Ageas Bowl Test status and a Test match between England and Sri Lanka in 2011, with the redevelopment scheduled to be completed before the Test match. The redevelopment was beset with a number of problems. During the construction of the new stands, a construction worker was crushed to death in February 2009, while prior to the Test match the new access road still had not been constructed. Meanwhile, legal action by local hoteliers led to the construction of the hotel at the Northern End being put on hold, with the hoteliers objecting to the possible impact on competition and to the use of public funds from Eastleigh Borough Council.

As part of their preparations for the Test match, the Ageas Bowl was awarded the right to host finals day of the 2010 Friends Provident t20, during which Hampshire became the first county to win the final at their home ground, when they defeated Somerset in controversial circumstances. Also in 2010, the Ageas Bowl was voted "Best International Ground" in an independent ECB survey of fans around the country and was also voted the "Most Improved Ground" by readers of All Out Cricket magazine.

The first Test match was played on 16–20 June 2011. It was a heavily rain affected match that ended in a draw, but did see Ian Bell and Kumar Sangakkara score the first Test centuries at the ground, in addition to Chris Tremlett taking the first five wicket haul.

Hampshire found themselves £12 million in debt by the end of the 2011 season. With the county unable to maintain the upkeep of the ground from their own finances, the decision was taken to sell the lease from Queens College Oxford (the Landlord) to Eastleigh Borough Council and to sub-lease from the council with buy-back options. This transaction was conditional on a further injection of £6million from Rod Bransgrove and was completed in January 2012. The council also administered some £30million Prudential Funding from Central Government for the building of the hotel, which was given the go-ahead after the legal action by local hoteliers was quashed at the High Court.

On 29 August 2013, the Australian opener Aaron Finch set a new record for Twenty20 international cricket when he scored 156 runs off 63 balls for Australia against England at the Ageas Bowl. Finch's innings included 14 sixes (also a record) and 11 fours. The previous record was 123 runs, scored by Brendon McCullum of New Zealand. In 2020 the ground was used as one of two biosecure venues, alongside Old Trafford, for the tours involving West Indies, Pakistan and Ireland which were regulated due to the COVID-19 pandemic.

Facilities and functions

Besides the main cricket ground at the Ageas Bowl, an additional satellite ground borders the main ground to the south-east. Known as the Nursery Ground, it hosts Hampshire Second XI matches at the Hampshire Academy in Southern Premier Cricket League matches.  Its end names are the Northern End and the Golf Club End. Its pavilion is named after Arthur Holt, who coached Hampshire from 1949 to 1965. The Nursery Ground has hosted one first-class match, Hampshire v Loughborough MCCU in April 2013.

The main pavilion, now known as the Rod Bransgrove Pavilion, holds the players facilities, as well as facilities for club members, such as the Robin Smith Suite, Derek Shackleton suite, the Richards Suite, the Greenidge Suite and The Hambledons (a suite named after the famous Hambledon Club). Located between the pavilion and the cricket academy building is the atrium restaurant. The cricket academy, which has six lanes of cricket nets is used by county squads, the Hampshire Academy, cricket clubs and schools. It is known to have some of the best facilities of its kind outside of Lord's and is available for hire by the general public. The two new stands include permanent catering facilities along the internal concourse of the ground floor, which were lacking prior to the redevelopment. Also located on the ground floor of the west stand is the club shop. Both of the new stands contain suites which can be used for conferences and exhibitions outside of match days.  The stands are named after two of Hampshire's most popular captains, Colin Ingleby-MacKenzie and Shane Warne.

Also part of the Ageas Bowl complex is the Boundary Lakes Golf Club, an eighteen-hole golf course opened in 2017 and set in the rolling countryside which surrounds large parts of the main stadium. The current clubhouse and golf shop are located in the Hilton Hotel. It is hoped the course will be able to host major championship golf tournaments in the future. A David Lloyd health club (formerly Virgin Active) is also onsite.

Every November the Ageas Bowl hosts one of the largest fireworks displays on the South Coast. The Ageas Bowl also acts as a venue big-name music concerts. Recent acts to have performed at the Ageas Bowl include Oasis in 2005, who performed in front of 35,000 people, Billy Joel in 2006, the Who in 2007, Neil Diamond and R.E.M., both in 2008, Rod Stewart in 2016, Bryan Adams and Little Mix, both in 2017. The late Italian opera singer Luciano Pavarotti was due to play at the ground in 2006, but cancelled his farewell UK tour due to ill health.

List of centuries

Test centuries
 a total of 8 centuries have been scored in international test cricket on the ground.

One-Day International centuries
 a total of 23 centuries have been scored in one-day international cricket on the ground.

List of five-wicket hauls

Test match five-wicket hauls
, 12 five-wicket hauls have been taken in international matches on the ground, eight in Test matches and four in ODIs.

One Day International five-wicket hauls

Other International records on the ground

Test 
 Highest team total: 583/8d by England against Pakistan, 2020
 Lowest team total: 170 by India against New Zealand, 2021
 Highest individual innings: 267 by Zak Crawley for England against Pakistan, 2020
 Best bowling in an innings: 6/42 by Jason Holder for West Indies against England, 2020
 Best bowling in a match: 9/137 by Shannon Gabriel for West Indies against England, 2020

One-Day International 
 Highest team total: 373/3 (50 overs) by England against Pakistan, 2019
 Lowest team total: 65 (24 overs) by USA against Australia, 2004
 Highest individual innings: 189 not out by Martin Guptill for New Zealand against England, 2013
 Best bowling in an innings: 5/29 by Mervyn Dillon for West Indies against Bangladesh, 2004 and 5/29 by Shakib Al Hasan for Bangladesh against Afghanistan, 2019

Twenty20 International 
 Highest team total: 248/6 (20 overs) by Australia against England, 2013
 Lowest team total: 79 (14.3 overs) by Australia against England, 2005
 Highest individual innings: 156 by Aaron Finch for Australia against England, 2013
 Best bowling in an innings: 4/22 by Paul Collingwood for England against Australia, 2005

Domestic records

First-class 
 Highest team total: 714/5d by Hampshire against Nottinghamshire, 2005
 Lowest team total: 86 by Worcestershire against Hampshire, 2007
 Highest individual innings: 311* by John Crawley for Hampshire against Nottinghamshire, 2005
 Best bowling in an innings: 8/90 by Alan Mullally for Hampshire against Warwickshire, 2001
 Best bowling in a match: 11/59 by Kyle Hogg for Lancashire against Hampshire, 2011

List A 
 Highest team total: 350/5 (50 overs) by Gloucestershire against Hampshire, 2008
 Lowest team total: 101 (36.4 overs) by Sussex against Hampshire, 2003
 Highest individual innings: 167* by Sean Ervine for Hampshire against Ireland, 2009
 Best bowling in an innings: 6/27 by Stuart Clark for Hampshire against Surrey, 2007

Twenty20 
 Highest team total: 225/2 (20 overs) by Hampshire against Middlesex, 2006
 Lowest team total: 72 (14 overs) by Kent against Hampshire, 2011
 Highest individual innings: 124 not out by Michael Lumb for Hampshire against Essex, 2009
 Best bowling in an innings: 5/19 by Danny Briggs for Hampshire against Durham, 2011

Ground images

Before redevelopment

After redevelopment

See also
List of Hampshire County Cricket Club grounds
List of cricket grounds in England and Wales
List of Test cricket grounds

Notes

References

Further reading

External links

The Ageas Bowl at ESPNcricinfo

Hampshire County Cricket Club
Test cricket grounds in England
Cricket grounds in Hampshire
Golf clubs and courses in Hampshire
Sports venues completed in 2001
2019 Cricket World Cup stadiums
Borough of Eastleigh